Red Sea Air was a domestic airline based in Asmara, the capital of Eritrea. It was at one time the national flag carrier. Eritrean Airlines owned 40% of the airline, which operated domestic routes between Asmara, Assab and Massawa. Red Sea Air had a fleet of BAC 1-11s

The airline operated from 1988 to 2000.

Code data
IATA Code: RS
ICAO Code: ERS
Callsign: Eritrean Redsea

References

Defunct airlines of Eritrea
Airlines established in 1988
Airlines disestablished in 2000
Organisations based in Asmara
1988 establishments in Ethiopia